Bangkok is home to a number of theatres and concert halls.

Concert halls and theatres

Aksra Theatre
Alliance Française Auditorium
AUA Language Center Auditorium
Ban Chang Thai
Bangkok Convention Centre
Bangkok International Trade and Exhibition Centre (BITEC)
Bangkok Theatre@Metropolis 
BEC Tero Hall
BNK48 The Campus (BNK48 Theater)
British Council Centre
Centara Grand Convention Centre
Center Point Theatre@CentralWorld
Children's Discovery Theatre
Chulalongkorn Conference Hall
Culture Collective Studio
Digital Gateway Hall, Siam Square
EKKOLO Theatre  
Goethe Institute Auditorium
Grand Theatre                                                
Impact Arena
IMPACT Challenger
Indoor Stadium Huamark
Japan Foundation Theatre
Joe Louis Puppet Theatre
Kasetsart Conference Hall
M Theatre
Makhampom Studio
MCC Hall
Muangthai Conference Hall
Muangthai Rachadalai Theatre
Music Auditorium of the College of Music, Mahidol University (MACM Hall)
National Theatre of Thailand
New Thailand Cultural Centre@ Suan Lum (proposed)
Patravadi Theatre
Piyabhand Sanitwongse Foundation Hall
Playhouse Theatre
Pridi Institute Auditorium
Queen Sirikit National Convention Center
Royal Paragon Hall
Royal Thai Navy Hall
Sala Chalermkrung Royal Theatre
Scala Theatre
Siam Niramit Theatre
Siam Opera (under construction)
Siam Pavali Theatre
Thailand Creative & Design Center (TCDC)
Thailand Cultural Centre
Thailand Knowledge Park 
Thamasat Conference Hall

See also
List of cinemas in Thailand

Theatres in Bangkok
Music venues in Thailand
Theatres
Bangkok
Theatres